A population is in Malthusian equilibrium when all of its production is used only for subsistence. Malthusian equilibrium is a locally stable and a dynamic equilibrium.

See also
Thomas Malthus — See this article for further exposition.
An Essay on the Principle of Population
Malthusian growth model
Malthusian trap
Population dynamics

References

Population
Mathematical modeling